Paul M. Souder House is a national historic site located at 242 Greenwood Avenue, Sarasota, Florida in Manatee County.

It was added to the National Register of Historic Places on November 2, 2000.

References

National Register of Historic Places in Manatee County, Florida
Houses on the National Register of Historic Places in Florida